The titled nobility of England and Ireland consisted of one rank until 1337, namely that of earl. Edward I (1272–1307) led a restrictive policy on the creation of new earldoms, and at the end of his reign the number of earls was at eleven. The final years of the thirteenth century had seen a dramatic fall-off in the upper level of the nobility, as six earls had died from 1295 to 1298. The earldoms of Hereford and Essex, Hertford and Gloucester, Lancaster, Oxford and Warwick had been filled by 1300, while that of Pembroke had to wait until 1307. Aymer de Valence, 2nd Earl of Pembroke, whose father William died in 1296, did not succeed until his mother's death in 1307, since the earldom descended through the female line of the family. Another great generational change occurred in the years 1306–1307, when six new earls entered the peerage. In addition to Pembroke, the heirs of the earldoms of Arundel, Richmond and Surrey entered into their inheritance. Gilbert de Clare, 7th Earl of Hertford, whose father Gilbert de Clare, 6th Earl of Hertford had died in 1295, was allowed to enter into his patrimony in 1307, after it had been held by his stepfather Ralph de Monthermer, 1st Baron Monthermer for the life of Gilbert's mother. Finally, Piers Gaveston was in 1307 given the earldom of Cornwall, left vacant by the death of Edmund, 2nd Earl of Cornwall in 1300.

Of this group, the wealthiest and most powerful was Thomas, 2nd Earl of Lancaster. Thomas was the son of Edmund Crouchback, 1st Earl of Lancaster, who in turn was the son of King Henry III. This made Thomas the nephew of King Edward I, and the cousin of Edward's son Edward II (1307–1327). In addition to the earldom of Lancaster, Thomas was also earl of Leicester and Derby. He was also the son-in-law and heir of Henry de Lacy, 3rd Earl of Lincoln, and at Henry's death in 1311 he succeeded to the earldom of Lincoln as well. Thomas enjoyed a gross income of around £11,000far in excess of the second wealthiest earl, Guy de Beauchamp, 10th Earl of Warwick with about £6,000. At the other end of the scale was Robert de Vere, 6th Earl of Oxford, whose possessions were almost insufficient to uphold the honour of an earldom, but who still maintained his status based on his ancient lineage.

King Edward II had the advantage of a young and sympathetic nobility when he succeeded his father in 1307, and the troubles with which his reign has been associated were not apparent at this point. These difficulties were largely caused by his appointment of Piers Gaveston to the earldom of Cornwall immediately after the accession. Gaveston was a relative upstart, and was seen as arrogant by the established nobility. He was considered to have far too much influence over the king, and had already been exiled once by Edward I. Matters were made worse by the fact that it was the earldom of Cornwall he was given, as this earldom had long been thought of as inalienable from the crown. Thomas of Lancaster gradually emerged as the leader of the opposition against the king, particularly after the death of the old and esteemed Henry de Lacy, who had up until then been a moderating force. Lancaster's closest associate was the earl of Warwick, who was even more fervent in his antagonism than Lancaster. Other earls, like Hertford and Pembroke, remained essentially loyal to the king.

List of peers

See also
List of earldoms

Notes

b.  The title had been dormant since the death without issue of Hugh d'Aubigny, 5th Earl of Arundel in 1243, and though Richard's father John FitzAlan, lord of Arundel is sometimes styled earl of Arundel in the literature, he never used this title. Richard FitzAlan was the first of the FitzAlan family to be styled earl of Arundel by contemporaries.
c. In 1302 Roger granted his lands to the king, and received them back for life. Henceat his deathhis lands and title reverted to the crown.

References

Bibliography

England and Ireland
1300-1309
14th century in England
14th century in Ireland
Titled